The Cuisine of Ohio is part of the broader regional cuisine of the Midwestern United States.

History
This region was rich in natural resources including wild turkeys, bears, deer, elk, and pigeons in large numbers, along with large buffalo herds. The buffalo population dwindled as settlement increased, but were still being hunted in southeastern Ohio as late as 1792. In 1785, Richard Butler gave details of a supper that included "fine roast buffalo beef, soup of buffalo beef and turkeys, fried turkeys, fried cat fish, fresh caught, roast ducks, good punch, madeira, claret, grog and toddy". The "fine venison, bear meat, turkeys and catfish" eaten by Butler's party was supplied entirely by hunting and fishing, or in Butler's words "procured by themselves at pleasure".

Venison and turkey were the most popular game, and fish like pike, catfish, sturgeon, pickerel, bass and perch were plentiful. In lean times raccoons, squirrels, opossums and other less desirable game could be consumed. One writer in the Revolutionary era wrote that a hunter could kill six to eight deer each day.

Wheat didn't take to the rich soils around Ohio so wheat bread remained a rare luxury, and many crops were hard to come by in the early years. When The Ohio Company settled Marietta in the spring of 1788 they planted potatoes, turnips, pumpkins, corn, squash, melons, beans and cucumbers. Unexpectedly harsh weather in 1789 destroyed the crops that year leading to severe food shortages in what came to be called "the starving year". Pork was usually preserved by various methods, the most common being brining in a pork barrel, but hogs were few in number and salt had to be carried across the Allegheny Mountains to reach the Ohio Company settlement. By winter's end many families had run out of cornmeal, and even the wealthiest families were left with little more than a few potatoes. At the first signs of spring pioneers gathered nettles and purslane, but it wasn't until July that new corn, beans and squash were harvested early and made into soup.

In 1792 Jack Heckewelder described corn, barley, potatoes, turnips, oats, millet, and wheat growing in Cincinnati, and though settlement in the area was still sparse a garrison of around 200 at Fort Washington had planted "very fine" vegetable gardens. Buckwheat cakes were common, and the travel journal of Francis Bailey from 1797 notes that settlers extracted the syrup of sugar maples and depended on game meats like wild turkey and venison during the winter months.

Specialties

Buckeye candy is a local specialty, popular in the state of Ohio. The confection is a variation of standard peanut butter cups known as a 'Buckeye'. Coated in chocolate, with a partially exposed center of peanut butter fudge, the candy resembles the appearance of the nut that grows on the state tree, commonly known as the buckeye.

Cincinnati-style chili is a Greek-inspired meat sauce, (ground beef seasoned with cinnamon, nutmeg, allspice, cloves, bay leaf, cumin, chili powder, and in some home recipes, chocolate), used as a topping for spaghetti or hot dogs. Additionally, red beans, chopped onions, and shredded cheese are offered as extra toppings referred to as "ways."

A popular snack food in Ohio are sauerkraut balls, a meatball-sized fritter containing sauerkraut and some combination of ham, bacon, and pork. The recipe was invented in the late 1950s by two brothers, Max and Roman Gruber for their five star restaurant, Gruber's, located in Shaker Heights, Ohio. These were a derivative of the various ethnic cultures of Northeast Ohio, which includes Akron and Greater Cleveland.  An annual Sauerkraut Festival is held in Waynesville, Ohio. at which sauerkraut balls, along with other sauerkraut specialities, are served. Sauerkraut balls are the official dish of Akron.

Clambakes are very popular in Northeast Ohio. The region, which was originally part of the Connecticut Western Reserve, was initially settled by people from Connecticut and other New England states. A typical Northeast Ohio clam bake typically includes clams, chicken, sweet potatoes, corn, and other side dishes. Unlike in New England, seaweed is not used and the clams, chicken, and sweet potatoes are all steamed together in a large pot. John D. Rockefeller started the tradition in Ohio.

Barberton, Ohio, part of the greater Akron area, is a small industrial city and home of Barberton chicken, a dish of chicken deep fried in lard that was created by Serbian immigrants. It is usually accompanied by a hot rice dish, vinegar coleslaw and french fries.

Mansfield, Ohio is the home of both Stewart's Restaurants, creator of Stewart's Fountain Classics Sodas, and Isaly Dairy Company, creator of the famed Klondike bar ice cream, both now sold world-wide.

References

Further reading
 

 
Ohio culture